Munchkin, Inc. is a privately-held infant and toddler company headquartered in Van Nuys, California. It was founded in 1991 by Steven B. Dunn and is known for designing, developing, manufacturing and distributing infant and toddler supplies.

History
Stephen B. Dunn founded Munchkin with $2.5 million in 1991. 

In 2010, Munchkin acquired Lindam, a safety brand for babies.

In 2014, Munchkin acquired Brica, a travel accessories brand for babies and toddlers.

In 2016, Munchkin acquired Milkmakers, a manufacturer of lactogenic cookies.

In February 2020, the company added prenatal tea, belly balm, and nausea relief drops to its Milkmaker line.

In January 2022, Munchkin announced it was working with sustainable polymer additive company Smart Plastic Technologies. Through the partnership, Munchkin will use Smart Plastic's Eclipse technology that is designed to bioassimilate polyolefins like polyethylene and polypropylene, so the plastic completely biodegrades.

Business 
Munchkin manufactures more than 600 products for infants and toddlers. It holds hundreds of patents, including one for its Miracle 360 sippy cup. Dunn serves as the lead inventor for many of the company's products.

The company also has a licensing deal with Baby Toon, a soft silicone spoon designed by Cassidy Crowley, who featured in the season 11 premiere episode of reality investment TV program Shark Tank when she was 10 years old.

Munchkin's sustainability efforts include goals to reduce packing materials and increase the amount of recyclable plastics it uses. It participates in Walmart's Project Gigaton to reduce greenhouse gas emissions, and is also part of the United Nations Global Compact sustainability initiative.

Former NBC anchor, Lynn Smith, is the host Munchkin's podcast "StrollerCoaster: A Parenting Podcast."

Philanthropy
In 2015, Dunn pledged to donate $1 million to The Whale Sanctuary Project to help build a coastal ocean sanctuary for captive orcas after watching the documentary Blackfish. In 2018, Munchkin partnered with the International Fund for Animal Welfare by featuring at-risk or endangered animals, like the African elephant and red fox, on a line of its Miracle Cups to raise awareness about conservation and animal rights.

Munchkin is a sponsor of The Seedling Project and plants a tree for every diaper pail sold. As of February 2020, the project reported that more than 2,000,000 trees had been planted. The company also supports Children's Hospital Los Angeles and Baby2Baby.

References

External links
Munchkin Website

Retail companies established in 1991
Retail companies based in California
Companies based in Los Angeles
Baby products
Online retailers of the United States
1991 establishments in California
American brands